Windsor Hotel may refer to:

in Asia
Windsor Hotel Taichung, Taichung, Taiwan
The Windsor Hotel Toya Resort & Spa, Hokkaidō, Japan
The Hotel Windsor, Myoko, Japan

in Australia
Hotel Windsor (Melbourne), Australia
Windsor Hotel (Perth), Western Australia

in Canada
Windsor Hotel (Montreal), Canada
Windsor Arms Hotel, Toronto, Canada
An informal name for Caesars Windsor
Windsor Hotel, Sault Ste. Marie, Ontario
in Egypt
Windsor Hotel (Cairo), Egypt

in the United States
Windsor Hotel (Memphis), original name of the Lorraine Motel where Martin Luther King was assassinated
Windsor Hotel (Americus, Georgia)
Windsor Hotel (Garden City, Kansas), listed on the NRHP in Finney County, Kansas 
Windsor Hotel (Manhattan), New York City
Windsor Hotel (Phoenix, Arizona), listed in the National Register of Historic Places. 
Windsor Hotel (San Diego), part of the Gaslamp Quarter Historic District

See also
Windsor Atlantica Hotel, Rio de Janeiro, Brazil
Windsor Court Hotel, New Orleans, USA
Windsor Plaza Hotel Saigon, Ho Chi Minh City, Vietnam